The Baku 2013-14 season was Baku's sixteenth Azerbaijan Premier League season. They competed in the 2013–14 Azerbaijan Premier League, finishing 5th, and reached the Quarterfinals of the 2013–14 Azerbaijan Cup where they were defeated by Ravan Baku. It was Milinko Pantićs first season as manager, having replaced Božidar Bandović on 14 June after Bandović left his position at the end of the 2012-13 season.

Squad

Out on loan

Transfers

Summer

In:

 

 
 
 
 

Out:

Winter

In:

Out:

Competitions

Friendlies

Azerbaijan Premier League

Results summary

Results by round

Results

League table

Azerbaijan Cup

Squad statistics

Appearances and goals

|-
|colspan="14"|Players who away from the club on loan:

|-
|colspan="14"|Players who appeared for Baku no longer at the club:

|}

Goal scorers

Disciplinary record

References
Qarabağ have played their home games at the Tofiq Bahramov Stadium since 1993 due to the ongoing situation in Quzanlı.
Baku vs Ravan was played at the Tofiq Bahramov Stadium training ground due to the Tofiq Bahramov Stadium pitch being relaid.

External links 
 FK Baku at Soccerway.com

FC Baku seasons
Baku